BXW may refer to:

 Banana Xanthomonas wilt, a bacterial disease.
 Bankagooma (ISO 639-3 code BXW), a language native to Mali.
 Box Hill & Westhumble railway station (three letter code BXW), a station near Dorking, England.